Richard Thomas or Dick Thomas may refer to:

Arts, entertainment and media
 Dick Thomas (singer) (1915–2003), American singing cowboy and actor
 Richard Thomas (actor) (born 1951), American actor
 Richard Thomas (author) (born 1967), American author
 Richard Thomas (dancer) (1925–2013), American dancer
 Richard Thomas (musician) (born 1964), British musician, writer, and comedy actor
 Richard Thomas, drummer on The Jesus and Mary Chain album Automatic
 Richard K. Thomas (born 1953), live theatre sound and composition advocate

Government and politics
 Richard Thomas (solicitor) (born 1949), British lawyer and former Information Commissioner
 Richard Thomas (Pennsylvania politician) (1744–1832), US Congressman from Pennsylvania
 Richard Thomas (Royal Navy officer) (1932–1998), Admiral and Black Rod in the House of Lords
 Richard Thomas, mayor of Mount Vernon, NY (2016–2019)
 Richard C. Thomas (1937–1991), politician and government official in Vermont
 Richard V. Thomas (1932–2010), justice of the Wyoming Supreme Court

Religion
 Richard Thomas (bishop) (1881–1958), Anglican bishop and Archdeacon in Australia
 Richard Thomas (priest) (1753–1780), Welsh Anglican priest and antiquarian
 Richard Rice Thomas (died 1942), Archdeacon of St Davids

Sports
 Dick Thomas (rugby league), Welsh rugby league footballer
 Dick Thomas (rugby union) (1883–1916), Welsh rugby union footballer
 Richard Thomas (cricketer, born 1792) (1792–1881), English cricketer
 Richard Thomas (cricketer, born 1867) (1867–1918), English cricketer
 Richard Thomas (shooter) (1941–2016), American shooter, instrumental in establishing International Defensive Pistol Association
 Richie Thomas (Richard James Thomas, born 1942), Welsh cricketer
 Ritchie Thomas (Richard John Harold Thomas, 1915–1988), Australian rules footballer

Other people
 Richard Thomas (civil engineer) (1779–1858), English civil engineer
 Richard Thomas (herpetologist) (born 1938), American herpetologist
 Richard Thomas (mathematician), professor of mathematics at Imperial College London
 Richard Thomas (tin plate manufacturer) (1837–1916), British manufacturer and founder of Richard Thomas & Co Ltd.
 Richard Thomas (Zarvona) (1833–1875), Confederate colonel and privateer known as "the French lady" during the American Civil War
 Richard Darton Thomas (1777–1857), Royal Navy officer
 Richard G. Thomas (1930–2006), American pilot
 Richard Grenfell Thomas (1901–1974), Australian mineralogist
 Richard F. Thomas (born 1950), professor of classics at Harvard University
 Richard Walter Thomas (born 1936), professor known for his work on black issues and race relations

See also
 
 
 Richard Beaumont-Thomas (1860–1917), managing director of Richard Thomas & Co Ltd.
 Ricky Thomas (born 1965), American football player